Neil Robert Tovey OIS (born 2 July 1962) is a South African football coach and former player and also brother of former footballer Mark Tovey. He was born in Pretoria. He holds the record for most appearances in the National Soccer League.

Early career
Tovey was born in Pretoria but grew up in Durban. He had been playing soccer since 1969. He aspired to be a doctor before opting to play professional football. His brother Mark who was also a footballer used to give him football lessons. He was also coached at junior level at Juventus Durban by Clive Barker.

Club career

Durban City
He made his professional debut for Durban City in 1981 and won the 1982 and 1983 NPSL titles under Clive Barker and played 176 league games. Tovey was transfer listed on 12 March 1986.

AmaZulu
He scored on debut in a 2--1 win over Arcadia Shepherds in Durban on 4 April 1986. He also scored in a 5--1 win over Kaizer Chiefs on 8 June 1986 in what became Chiefs' worst loss ever. He stayed until 1989 and played 117 league games.

Kaizer Chiefs
He joined Chiefs in 1990 and took over captaincy from Howard Freese in 1992 wearing the number 9 jersey. In the same season, Tovey got a record 52 starts which is still a record. He was converted to defence by Philippe Troussier. He led Chiefs to cup victory scored two very important goals in the Rothmans Cup against QwaQwa Stars and Umtata Bush Bucks. He played 341 league games for Chiefs. He played 362 matches and scored 32 goals in all competitions. In the very last match of his career and his last two touches Chiefs colours resulted in a goal in a 5–1 win over Dynamos on 9 June 1999.

International career
Tovey is a former player of the South Africa national football team, and won 52 caps for the national side without scoring a goal. He captained the team 29 times.

Coaching career
Tovey coached Banyana Banyana to COSAFA Cup victory in 2002. Tovey saved Hellenic from relegation in the 2003–04 season. He got his UEFA A licence with a 90% pass in Hennef, Germany, which were the best marks since 1998.
On 27 June 2015 Tovey became technical director of South Africa national football team.

Personal life
Tovey lives in Johannesburg with his wife Nadine Tovey and has three children, Bianca (b. 1991), Jessica (b. 1993) and Sheldon (b. 1997). His second daughter Jessica was a Miss Teen SA finalist in 2011 where Tyra Banks shared a picture of her on Instagram. Sheldon wears a hearing aid and has impaired speech because oxygen was cut off from his brain after being burnt by scalding water in 1998. On 23 February 2015, Tovey was admitted to ICU after suffering from three heart attacks during a game of squash. Tovey suffered a further heart attack in October 2016, and was admitted to hospital.

References

External links

South African soccer players
South African soccer managers
South Africa international soccer players
AmaZulu F.C. players
Living people
1962 births
Kaizer Chiefs F.C. players
1997 FIFA Confederations Cup players
Soccer players from Pretoria
White South African people
South African people of English descent
1996 African Cup of Nations players
Mamelodi Sundowns F.C. managers
AmaZulu F.C. managers
Hellenic F.C. managers
Association football central defenders
Alumni of Northwood School, Durban